Scopula takao is a moth of the family Geometridae. It is found in Japan.

The wingspan is 17–25 mm.

References

Moths described in 1954
takao
Moths of Japan